The 2004 Judgment Day was the sixth Judgment Day professional wrestling pay-per-view (PPV) event produced by World Wrestling Entertainment (WWE). It was held exclusively for wrestlers from the promotion's SmackDown! brand division. The event took place on May 16, 2004, at Staples Center in Los Angeles, California.

The main event was for the WWE Championship between Eddie Guerrero and John "Bradshaw" Layfield (JBL), which JBL won by disqualification after Guerrero hit JBL with the WWE Championship belt; titles do not change hands via disqualification or countout unless stipulated, thus Guerrero retained. Featured matches on undercard were The Undertaker versus Booker T, John Cena versus René Duprée for the WWE United States Championship and Chavo Guerrero versus Jacqueline for the WWE Cruiserweight Championship.

Production

Background
Judgment Day was first held by World Wrestling Entertainment (WWE) as the 25th In Your House pay-per-view (PPV) in October 1998. It then returned in May 2000 as its own event, establishing Judgment Day as the promotion's annual May PPV. The 2004 event was the sixth event in the Judgment Day chronology and was held on May 16 at Staples Center in Los Angeles, California. While the previous year's event had featured wrestlers from both the Raw and SmackDown! brands, the 2004 event featured wrestlers exclusively from the SmackDown! brand.

Storylines
The main rivalry heading into Judgment Day was between Eddie Guerrero and John "Bradshaw" Layfield (JBL) with the two battling over the WWE Championship. On the March 25 episode of SmackDown!, recently drafted Raw superstar Booker T insulted SmackDown! superstars. The new SmackDown! General Manager Kurt Angle gave Booker an opportunity against Guerrero for the WWE Championship. A member of the recently disbanded APA, JBL interfered in the match, having turned heel earlier in the night and attacked Guerrero with a Clothesline from Hell. On the April 8 episode of SmackDown!, Angle announced that the winner of the Great American Award would become the number one contender for the WWE Championship and gave the award to JBL. However, Guerrero came out, stole the trophy and broke it. On the April 22 episode of SmackDown!, Guerrero lost to D-Von Dudley in a non-title match after another interference by JBL. On the April 29 episode of SmackDown!, JBL cut a promo about Guerrero's ancestors, saying they were illegal immigrants. On the May 6 episode of SmackDown!, it was announced that JBL caused Guerrero's mother to suffer a heart attack at a house show on May 2 when he threatened her and grabbed her by the shoulder in front of Guerrero's family. On the May 13 episode of SmackDown!, Guerrero was arrested after he destroyed JBL's limousine, and JBL defeated Guerrero's friend Rey Mysterio.

The other main match on the card was between Booker T and The Undertaker. On the April 22 episode of SmackDown!, Booker defeated Rob Van Dam and bragged about how he was the biggest star on the SmackDown! brand, but then ran away as he saw Undertaker walk down the ramp. On the April 29 episode of SmackDown!, Booker tried to attack ‘Taker to no avail, making Kurt Angle book a match between them for Judgment Day. On the May 6 episode of SmackDown!, Booker went to a voodoo witch in order to try and overcome ‘Taker, and the witch told him to use dirt from an unmarked grave against his foe. On the May 13 episode of SmackDown!, Booker defeated the FBI, and then had a staredown with The Undertaker.

Another feud heading into the event was between John Cena and Rene Dupree over the WWE United States Championship. The feud began after Dupree was drafted to the SmackDown! brand. On the April 22 episode of SmackDown!, Dupree had a talk show called "Cafe de René", with Torrie Wilson as his guest. Dupree insulted Wilson and tried to attack her, only for Cena to save her. On the April 29 episode of SmackDown!, Cena interfered in Dupree's match with Wilson, and Kurt Angle booked the match for Judgment Day. On the May 6 episode of SmackDown!, both Cena and Dupree attacked each other during Dawn Marie and Torrie Wilson's match. On the May 13 episode of SmackDown!, Dupree said that he would be the first French man to be the United States Champion.

Event

Before the event began, a dark match took place on Heat in which Mark Jindrak faced Funaki. Jindrak executed the Mark of Excellence on Funaki to win the match.

Preliminary matches
The event opened with Rob Van Dam and Rey Mysterio facing The Dudley Boyz (Bubba Ray Dudley and D-Von Dudley). Bubba and D-Von attempted a 3-D on Mysterio but Van Dam prevented the move and Mysterio performed a 619 on Bubba and D-Von. Van Dam performed a Five Star Frog Splash on D-Von to win the match.

Next, Torrie Wilson faced Dawn Marie. Wilson pinned Marie with a Backslide to win the match.

After that, Mordecai faced Scotty 2 Hotty. Mordecai performed The Crucifix on Scotty to win the match.

Later, Charlie Haas and Rico defended the WWE Tag Team Championship against Hardcore Holly and Billy Gunn. Hass pinned Holly with a Sunset Flip to retain the title.

Next, Jacqueline defended the WWE Cruiserweight Championship against Chavo Guerrero. Guerrero performed a Gory Bomb on Jacqueline to win the title.

After that, John Cena defended the WWE United States Championship against René Duprée. Cena performed an FU on Dupree to retain the title.

Later, The Undertaker faced Booker T. Undertaker performed a Tombstone Piledriver on Booker to win the match.

Main event
In the main event, Eddie Guerrero defended the WWE Championship against John "Bradshaw" Layfield (JBL). JBL performed a Back Body Drop onto a broadcast table on Guerrero. After Guerrero collided with the referee, JBL hit Guerrero with a steel chair, causing Guerrero to bleed profusely (which in reality was caused by botched blading that resulted in Guerrero cutting an artery in his forehead), and the steel steps. JBL performed a Clothesline from Hell on Guerrero as another referee counted the pinfall for a two count. JBL attempted a second Clothesline from Hell on Guerrero but Guerrero avoided, colliding with the referee. JBL performed a JBL Bomb on Guerrero and the original referee counted the pinfall for a two count. Guerrero attempted a Frog Splash but JBL avoided. JBL retrieved a steel chair, distracting the referee and allowing JBL to retrieve the title belt. Guerrero attacked JBL with a low blow whilst the referee was distracted. Guerrero struck JBL with the title belt, meaning JBL won the match by disqualification but Guerrero retained the title. After the match, Guerrero attacked JBL with a steel chair and attacked JBL until officials separated the two. Due to the amount of blood Eddie Guerrero lost, the event is rated TV-MA on the WWE Network.

Results

References

External links
Judgment Day 2004 official website

2004
Professional wrestling in Los Angeles
2004 in California
Events in Los Angeles
2004 WWE pay-per-view events
May 2004 events in the United States
WWE SmackDown